The following is a partial list of attacks on civilians attributed to armed groups under the control of the United States government, including the Army, Navy, Air Force, and North Atlantic Treaty Organization forces under U.S. control.  The items on the list are sites widely (though not in all cases universally) considered to be of a civilian nature that were directly (though in some cases mistakenly) targeted, and do not include errant bombs or other collateral damage resulting from imprecise attacks on military targets.

List of Attacks

See also 
 Civilian casualties from U.S. drone strikes
 Civilian casualties during Operation Allied Force
 List of killings by law enforcement officers in the United States
 Drone strikes in Yemen
 List of drone strikes in Pakistan

References

United States military-related lists